Noel James Gordon Bowden (19 March 1926 – 9 October 2009) was a New Zealand rugby union player. He played one match for the New Zealand national side, the All Blacks, a test against the touring Australian team in 1952, in which he kicked one penalty goal.

He also played in Scotland, turning out for West of Scotland. He was selected and played for Glasgow District in the Scottish Inter-District Championship.
He later became a lecturer in physical education at the North Shore College of Education. He was a prominent senior rugby coach in Auckland club rugby, coaching the Teachers Rugby Club for a number of years.

References

1926 births
2009 deaths
Rugby union players from Whangārei
People educated at Auckland Grammar School
New Zealand rugby union players
New Zealand international rugby union players
Auckland rugby union players
Waikato rugby union players
Taranaki rugby union players
Rugby union fullbacks
West of Scotland FC players
Glasgow District (rugby union) players
Expatriate rugby union players in Scotland
New Zealand expatriate sportspeople in Scotland